In cooking, a chef's knife, also known as a cook's knife, is a cutting tool used in food preparation. The chef's knife was originally designed primarily to slice and disjoint large cuts of beef. Today it is the primary general-utility knife for most western cooks.

There are two common types of blade shape in western chef's knives, French and German. German-style knives are more deeply and continuously curved along the whole cutting edge; the French style has an edge that is straighter until the end and then curves up to the tip.

Japanese kitchen knives have come under Western influence since the Meiji era, and many hybrid versions are available. The  "beef knife" is the Japanese term for a French (or Western) chef's knife. The gyuto were originally, and sometimes still called yo-boucho 洋包丁 meaning "Western Chefs Knife". The Santoku "three-virtue" knife is a style hybridized with traditional knives for more functionality. It is smaller, lighter and sharper with a different blade shape. 

The Chinese chef's knife is completely different and resembles a cleaver. It is, however, functionally analogous to the Western chef's knife in that it's a general-purpose knife not designed for breaking bones.

A modern chef's knife is a multi-purpose knife designed to perform well at many differing kitchen tasks, rather than excelling at any one in particular. It can be used for mincing, slicing, and chopping vegetables, slicing meat, and disjointing large cuts.

Physical characteristics 

Chef's knives are made with blades that are either forged or stamped:

 Forged: A hand forged blade is made in a multi-step process by skilled manual labor. A blank of steel is heated to a high temperature, and beaten to shape the steel. After forging, the blade is ground and sharpened. Forged knives are usually also full-tang, meaning the metal in the knife runs from the tip of the knifepoint to the far end of the handle. Commercially made forged knives are struck in a power hammer to produce features such as the bolster. 
 Stamped: A stamped blade is cut to shape directly from cold rolled steel, heat-treated for strength and temper, then ground, sharpened, and polished.

The blade of a chef's knife is typically made of carbon steel, stainless steel, a laminate of both metals, or ceramic:

 Carbon steel: An alloy of iron and approximately 1% carbon. Most carbon steel chef's knives are simple carbon iron alloys without exotic additions such as chrome or vanadium. Carbon steel blades are both easier to sharpen than ordinary stainless steel and usually hold an edge longer, but are vulnerable to rust and stains. Some professional cooks swear by knives of carbon steel because of their sharpness. Over time, a carbon-steel knife will normally acquire a dark  patina, and can rust or corrode if not cared for properly by cleaning and lubricating the blade after use. Some chefs also 'rest' their carbon-steel knives for a day after use in order to restore the oxidizing patina, which prevents transfer of metallic tastes to some foods. While some cooks prefer and use carbon steel knives (especially in Asia and the Middle East), others find carbon steel too maintenance-intensive in a kitchen environment.
 Stainless steel: An alloy of iron, approximately 10-15% of chromium, nickel, or molybdenum, with only a small amount of carbon. Lower grades of stainless steel cannot take as sharp an edge as good-quality high-carbon steels, but are resistant to corrosion, and are inexpensive. Higher grade and 'exotic' stainless steels (mostly from Japan) are extremely sharp with excellent edge retention, and equal or outperform carbon steel blades.
 Laminated: A laminated knife tries to use the best of each material by creating a layered sandwich of different materials—for instances, using a softer-but-tough steel as the backing material, and a sharper/harder - but more brittle - steel as the edge material.
 Ceramic blades hold an edge the longest of all, but they chip easily and may break if dropped. They also require special equipment and expertise to resharpen. They are sintered to shape with zirconium oxide powder. They are chemically nonreactive, so will not discolor or change the taste of food.

Handles are made of wood, steel, or synthetic/composite materials.

Edge 

The edge may be ground in different ways:

 Double grind, V-shape, single or double Bevel.
 Convex edge.
 Hollow-ground.
 Single grind or chisel edge.

In order to improve the chef's knife's multi-purpose abilities, some owners employ differential sharpening along the length of the blade. The fine tip, used for precision work such as mincing, might be ground with a very sharp, acute cutting bevel; the midsection or belly of the blade receives a moderately sharp edge for general cutting, chopping and slicing, while the heavy heel or back of the cutting edge is given a strong, thick edge for such heavy-duty tasks as disjointing beef.

Technique

Technique for the use of a chef's knife is an individual preference. For more precise control, most cooks prefer to grip the blade itself, with the thumb and the index finger grasping the blade just to the front of the finger guard and the middle finger placed just opposite, on the handle side of the finger guard below the bolster. This is commonly referred to as a "pinch grip". Those without culinary training often grip the handle, with all four fingers and the thumb gathered underneath.

For fine slicing, the handle is raised up and down while the tip remains in contact with the cutting board and the cut object is pushed under the blade.

See also
Chinese chef's knife
Japanese cutlery
Kitchen knife
Santoku

Notes

References
 
 
 Lee, Matt and Lee, Ted (December 15, 2004). When a Knife Is the Gleam in a Cook's Eye. New York Times.
 Cooking For Engineers - Examination of Parts of a Chef's Knife and what to look for when buying a kitchen knife.

External links

Kitchen knives